The First Crusade inspired the crusading movement, which became an important part of late-medieval western culture. The movement influenced the Church, politics, the economy, society, and created a distinct ideology that described, regulated, and promoted crusading. It was defined by legal and theological terms based on the concepts of holy war and pilgrimage. Theologically, the movement merged ideas of Old Testament wars instigated and assisted by God with New Testament ideas of forming personal relationships with Christ. The concept of crusading as holy war was based on the ancient idea of just war, in which an authority initiates the war, there is just cause, and the war is waged with pureness of intention. Crusades were seen as special pilgrimages—a physical and spiritual journey under the authority and protection of the Church. Pilgrimage and crusade were penitent acts and Crusade participants were considered part of Christ's army. While this was only metaphorical before the First Crusade, the concept was transferred from the clergy to the wider world. Crusaders attached crosses of cloth to their outfits, marking them as followers and devotees of Christ, responding to the biblical passage in Luke 9:23 which instructed them to carry one's cross and follow Christ. Anyone could be involved and those who died campaigning were considered martyrs.

Crusading was strongly associated with the recovery of Jerusalem and the Palestinian holy places. The Holy Land was considered the patrimony of Christ, and its recovery was on the behalf of God. The historic Christian focus on Jerusalem as the setting for Christ's act of redemption was fundamental for the First Crusade and the successful establishment of the institution of crusading. Campaigns to the Holy Land had enthusiastic support. The Crusading movement expanded to other theatres on the periphery of Christian Europe: the Iberian Peninsula; north-eastern Europe, against the Wends; the Baltic region; against heretics in France, Germany, and Hungary; and into mainly Italian campaigns against the papacy's political enemies. Common to all was papal sanction and the medieval concept of one Christian Church ruled by the papacy and separate from non-believers, so that Christendom was geopolitical. 

Crusading was a paradigm that grew from the encouragement of the Gregorian Reform of the 11thcentury and the movement declined after the Reformation. The ideology continued after the 16thcentury but in practical terms dwindled in competition with other forms of religious war and new ideologies.

Terminology
It only later came to describe belonging to the world and its affairs rather than those of the church and religion. It was usually a negative term meaning non-ecclesiastical, non-religious, or non-sacred. By the 16thcentury it described literature, history, art, music, writers, artists, buildings, education that were not concerned with or devoted to the service of religion. As a noun the word described one of the secular clergy to distinguish them from d monks, and by the 15thcentury it was used for someone who was engaged in the affairs of the world as opposed to the affairs of the church. The verb secularization describes conversion of an ecclesiastical institution or its property to secular ownership; the conversion of an Ecclesiastical polity to a lay one or the giving of a secular or non-sacred character direction to art, studies, morals, education etc.

Background

Inspired by the first crusades, the crusading movement defined late medieval western culture and had an enduring impact on the history of the western Islamic world. This influence was in every area of life across Europe. Christendom was geopolitical, and this underpinned the practice of the medieval Church. These ideas arose with the encouragement of the reformists of the 11thcentury and declined after the Reformation. The ideology of crusading continued after the 16thcentury with the military orders but dwindled in competition with other forms of religious war and new ideologies. 

The period following the collapse of the Carolingian Empire and the onset of the feudal revolution was seen by a reformist movement as an era of decline in morals and religious institutions. It was considered the result of too much involvement in the dealings of the mundus. In the 11thcentury the reformers responded primarily with the monasticisation and reform of the clergy. This reform was centred on ideals of personal piety, chastity, moral purity, spiritual discipline, and elaborate liturgies. The clerical reformers viewed themselves as architects of a re-established respublica Christiana. Focussed on the monastery at Cluny, this became known as Cluniac reform. Thus, an ideological framework was created for a faction within the clergy who saw themselves as God's agents for the moral and spiritual renewal of Christendom. As church historian Colin Morris noted, quoting Erdmann, this reforming party gaining control of the Roman Church was an important turning point because these were men who stood for the concept of holy war and sought to enact it.

International Relations Theory academic Andrew Latham identified three key pre-conditions that persisted during the Middle Ages.
 The reform of the essential identity of the Latin Church into an independent, motivated-by-God deliverer of religious renewal. The core interests of this identity provoked conflict with the Holy Roman Empire, Muslim polities, heretics, and pagans.
 The development of formal structures for building an army that furthered the Church's interests.
 
This new identity and developments created conflict between the Church and its opponents that become violent. The crusades were not only a function of anarchy but became part of wider social and political development. Without these factors, the crusades were impossible; and when these factors played less of a part, crusading declined.

Christianity and war

Texts describe the development of a distinct ideology that promoted and regulated crusades. The Church defined crusading in legal and theological terms based on the theory of holy war and the concept of pilgrimage. Theology merged Old Testament Israelite wars that were instigated and assisted by God with New Testament Christocentric views on forming individual relationships with Christ. It was the 4th-century theologian Augustine of Hippo who Christianised this, and canon lawyers developed it from the 11thcentury into , the paradigm of Christian holy war. Theologians widely accepted Henry of Segusio's justification that holy war against pagans was just because of their opposition to Christianity. 

The theology of war evolved from the linking of Roman citizenship with Christianity; Christian citizens now had the obligation to fight against the Empire's enemies. Augustine argued that war was sinful, but in certain circumstances, a "just war" could be rationalised. The criteria were:
 If an authority such as a king or bishop proclaimed the war.
 If it was defensive or for the recovery of territory.
 If combatants fought without an excessive degree of violence.

In the 11thcentury, the Church sponsored conflict with Muslims on the southern peripheries of Christendom, including the siege of Barbastro and fighting in Sicily In 1074, Gregory planned a holy war in support of Byzantium's struggles with Muslims, which produced a template for a crusade, but he was unable to garner the required support. 

Augustine's principles formed the basis of a doctrine of holy war that was later developed in the 13thcentury by Thomas Aquinas, canon lawyers, and theologians. Historians, such as Carl Erdmann, thought that from the 10thcentury the Peace and Truce of God movement restricted conflict between Christians. This movement's influence is apparent in Pope Urban II's speeches, but historians now assert that that influence was limited and had ended by the time of the crusades. 

Erdmann documented in The Origin of the Idea of Crusade the three stages of the development of a Christian institution of crusade:
 The Augustinian argument that the preservation of Christian unity was a just cause for warfare.
 The idea developed under Pope Gregory I that the conquest of pagans in an indirect missionary war was also in accordance.
 The paradigm developed under the reformist popes Leo IX, Alexander II, and Gregory VII, in the face of Islamic conflict, that it was right to wage war in defence of Christendom. 

The Church viewed Rome as the Patrimony of Saint Peter, and canon law considered crusades as purely defensive wars to protect theoretical Christian territory.

Penance and indulgence

Before the 11thcentury, the Latin Church developed a system that provided for the remission and absolution of sin in return for contrition, confession, and penitential acts. However, reparation through abstinence from martial activity presented a major challenge to the noble warrior class. In a revolutionary innovation at the end of the 11thcentury, Gregory VII offered absolution of sin earned through the Church-sponsored violence in support of his causes, if selflessly given. This was developed by subsequent Popes into the granting of plenary indulgence that reduced all God-imposed temporal penalties. At the Council of Clermont in November 1095, Urban II effectively founded the crusading movement with two recorded directives: 
 the exemption of atonement for those who journeyed to Jerusalem to free the Church;
 that while doing so all goods and property were protected.

The weakness of conventional theologies in the face of crusading euphoria is shown in a letter critical of Pope Paschal II from the writer Sigebert of Gembloux to the crusader Robert II, Count of Flanders. Sigebert referred to Robert's safe return from Jerusalem but completely avoided mentioning the crusade. It was Calixtus II who first promised the same privileges and protections of property to the families of crusaders. Under the influence of Bernard of Clairvaux, Eugenius III revised Urban's ambiguous position with the view that the crusading indulgence was remission from God's punishment for sin, as opposed to only remitting ecclesiastical confessional discipline. Innocent III emphasised crusader oaths and clarified that the absolution of sins was a gift from God, rather than a reward for the crusaders' suffering. With his 1213 bull Quia maior, he appealed to all Christians, not just the nobility, offering the possibility of vow redemption without crusading. This set a precedent for trading in spiritual rewards, a practice that scandalised devout Christians and became a contributing cause of the 16th century Protestant Reformation.

As late as the 16thcentury, writers sought redemptive solutions in the traditionalist wars of the cross, while otherssuch as English martyrologist John Foxesaw these as examples of papist superstition, corruption of religion, idolatry, and profanation. Critics blamed the Roman Church for the failure of the crusades. War against the infidel was laudable, but not crusading based on doctrines of papal power, indulgences, and against Christian religious dissidents such as the Albigensian and Waldensians. Justifying war on juristic ideas of just war to which Lutherans, Calvinists, and Roman Catholics could all subscribe, and the role of indulgences, diminished in Roman Catholics tracts on the Turkish wars. Alberico Gentili and Hugo Grotius developed international laws of war that discounted religion as a cause, in contrast to popes, who persisted in issuing crusade bulls for generations.

Knights and chivalry

At the beginning of the crusading movement, Chivalry was in its infancy; but it went on to define the ideas and values of knights, and was central to the crusading movement. Literature illustrated the prestige of knighthood, but it was distinct from the aristocracy. 11th and 12thcentury texts depict a class of knights that were closer in status to peasants within recent generations. In the 13thcentury knighthood became equated with nobility, as a social class with legal status, closed to non-nobles. Chivalric development grew from a society dominated by the possession of castles. Those who defended these became knights. At the same time, a novel form of combat evolved, based on the use of heavy cavalry, coupled with the growing naval capability of Italy's maritime republics, that strengthened the feasibility of the First Crusade. The new methods of warfare led to the development of codes, ethics, and ideologies. Contrary to the representation in the romances, battles were rare. Instead, raids and sieges predominated, for which there was only a minimal role for knights. During the 11th and 12thcenturies, the armies had a ratio of one knight to between seven and twelve infantry, mounted sergeants, and squires. Knighthood required combat training, which created solidarity and gave rise to combat as a sport. Crusade preachers used tournaments and other gatherings to obtain vows of support from attending dignitaries, begin persuasive campaigns, and announce a leader's taking of the cross. Military strategy and medieval institutions were immature in feudal Europe, with power too fragmented for the formation of disciplined units. Despite the courage of knights and some notable generalship, the crusades in the Levant were typically unimpressive.

Developing vernacular literature glorified the idea of adventure and the virtues of valour, largesse, and courtesy. This created an ideal of the perfect knight. Chivalry was a way of life, a social and moral model that evolved into a myth conflicting with the ideals of the Church. Whilst fearing this knightly ideal, the Church co-opted it in conflicts with feudal lords. Writers lauded those who fought for the Church; others were excommunicated. By the 11thcentury, the Church developed liturgical blessings sanctifying new knights; and existing literary themes, such as the legend of the Grail, were Christianized and treatises on chivalry written. In 1100, kings depicted themselves as knights to indicate their power. Participation in crusades was considered integral to idealized knightly behaviour. Crusading became part of the knightly class's self-identification, creating a cultural gap with other social classes. From the Fourth Crusade, it became an adventure normalised in Europe, which altered the relationship between knightly enterprise, religious, and worldly motivation.

Military Orders

The crusaders' propensity to follow the customs of their western European homelands meant that there were very few innovations adopted from the culture of the crusader states. Three notable exceptions to this were the military orders, warfare, and fortifications. The Knights Hospitaller were founded in Jerusalem before the First Crusade but added a martial element to their ongoing medical functions to become a much larger military order. In this way, knighthood entered the previously monastic and ecclesiastical sphere. Military orderslike the Knights Hospitaller and Knights Templarprovided Latin Christendom's first professional armies, to support the Kingdom of Jerusalem and the other crusader states. The Templars were founded around 1119 by a small band of knights who dedicated themselves to protecting pilgrims en route to Jerusalem. These orders became supranational organizations with papal support, leading to rich donations of land and revenue across Europe. This led to a steady flow of recruits and the wealth to maintain multiple fortifications in the crusader states. In time, the orders developed into autonomous powers. After the fall of Acre, the Hospitallers relocated to Cyprus, then conquered and ruled Rhodes (1309–1522) and Malta (1530–1798), and continue to exist to the present-day. King Philip IV of France had financial and political reasons to oppose the Knights Templar, which led him to exert pressure on Pope Clement V. The pope responded in 1312, with a series of papal bulls including Vox in excelso and Ad providam, which dissolved the order on alleged and false grounds of sodomy, magic, and heresy.

Common people

There were contributions to the crusading movement from classes other than the nobility and knights. Grooms, servants, smiths, armourers, and cooks provided services and could fight if required. Women also formed part of the armies. Despite papal recruitment concentrating on warriors in the movement's early years, it proved impossible to exclude non-knightly participants. Historians have increasingly researched the motivations of the poor who joined the early crusades in large numbers and engaged in popular unsanctioned events during the 13th and 14thcenturies. Participation was voluntary, so preaching needed to propagandise theology in popular forms, which often led to misunderstanding. For example, crusading was technically defensive, but amongst the poor, Christianity and crusading were aggressive. An emphasis on popular preaching, developed in the 12thcentury, generated a wealth of useful resources. The most popular example is that of Humbert of Romans from 1268. The popular but short-lived outbreaks of crusading enthusiasm after the fall of Acre were largely driven by eschatological perceptions of crusading amongst the poor rather than the advanced, professionalized plans advocated by theorists.
 
Pilgrimage was not a mass activity. To develop an association with the Holy Sepulchre, western Christians built models of the site across Europe and dedicated chapels. Although these acts predated crusading, they became increasingly popular and may have provided a backdrop to Easter Drama or sacramental liturgy. In this way, what was known as the remotest place in 1099 became embedded in daily devotion, providing a visible sign of what crusading was about.
 
Ungoverned, uncontrolled peasant crusading erupted in 1096, 1212, 1251, 1309, and 1320. Apart from the Children's Crusade of 1212, these were accompanied by violent antisemitism; it is unexplained why this was the exception. The literate classes were hostile to this particular unauthorized crusade but mytho-historicized it so effectively that it is one of the most evocative verbal artefacts from the Middle Ages that remained in European and American imagination. Although there are a number of written sources, they are of doubtful veracity, differing about dates and details while exhibiting mytho-historical motifs and plotlines.

Perception of Muslims

In medieval times, ethnic identity was a social construct, defined in terms of culture rather than race; and Christians considered all of humanity common descendants of Adam and Eve.
 
Although there are no specific references to crusading in the 11thcentury  , the author, for propaganda purposes, represented Muslims as monsters and idolators. Christian writers repeated this image elsewhere. Visual cues were used to represent Muslims as evil, dehumanized, and monstrous aliens with black complexions and diabolical physiognomies. This portrayal remained in western literature long after the territorial conflict of the crusades had faded into history. The term "Saracen" designated a religious community rather than a racial group, while the word "Muslim" is absent from the chronicles. Instead, various terms are usedsuch as infidels, gentiles, enemies of God, and pagans. The conflict was seen as a Manichean contest between good and evil. Historians have been shocked by the inaccuracy and hostility involved in such representations, which included crude insults to Mohammad, caricatures of Islamic rituals, and the representation of Muslims as libidinous gluttons, blood-thirsty savages, and semi-human. Historian Jean Flori argues that to self-justify Christianity's move from pacifism to warfare, their enemies needed to be ideologically destroyed.
 
By the Third Crusade, there is evidence of a class division within the nobility in both camps who shared a chivalric identity that overcame religious and political differences. This differentiated the two elites from their common co-religionists who had other loyalties. Increasingly, epics involved instances of conversion to Christianity, which promised a solution to the conflict in favour of the Franks at a time they were being defeated militarily. Poets often relied on the patronage of leading crusaders, so they extolled the values of the nobility, the feudal status quo, chivalry, martial prowess, and the idea of the Holy Land being God's territory usurped and despoiled. Writers designed works encouraging revenge on Muslims, who deserved punishment and were God's enemies. Works praised those who answered the call to crusade, writers vilified those who did not. The reformist Church's identity-interest complex framed Islam as a particular form of heresy. Muslim rule in formerly Christian territory was an "unjust" confiscation of Christian property, and this persecution of Christians required repayment. The view was that these injustices demanded Christian action. Islamic polities' own identity-interest complexes led them to be equally violently opposed to the restoration of Christian rule.

Evolution

Birth

The papacy developed "Political Augustinianism" into attempts to remove the Church from secular control by asserting ecclesiastical supremacy over temporal polities and the Orthodox Church. This was associated with the idea that the Church should actively intervene in the world to impose "justice". In the 12thcentury, Gratian and the Decretists elaborated on this, and Thomas Aquinas refined it in the 13thcentury. In the late 11th and early 12thcentury the papacy became a unit for organized violence in the Latin world order, equivalent to other kingdoms and principalities. This required what were partly inefficient, mechanisms of control that mobilised secular military forces under direct control of the papacy.
 
The sanctification of war developed during the 11thcentury through campaigns fought for, instigated, or blessed by the pope, including the Norman conquest of Sicily, the recovery of Iberia from the Muslims, and the Pisan and Genoese Mahdia campaign of 1087 to North Africa. Crusading followed this tradition, assimilating chivalry within the locus of the Church through:
 The concept of pilgrimage, the primary focus in Pope Urban II's call to crusade.
 The view on penance, that it could apply to killing adversaries.
 The identification of Muslims as pagans. This made those killed by them martyrs, equivalent to early Christian victims of pagan persecution.
 The identification of the recovery of the despoiled country of Christ. Urban assembled his own army to re-establish the patrimony of Christ over the heads of kings and princes.
 The principle that crusade knights were Christ's vassals. This refined the term used originally for Christians, then only for clergy and monks fighting evil through prayer, and from 1075 warriors fighting for St. Peter before the term became synonymous with crusaders. Knights no longer needed to abandon their way of life or become monks to achieve salvation. Crusading was a break with chivalry; Urban II denounced war among Christians as sinful, but fighting for Jerusalem led by a new knighthood was meritorious and holy. This ideology did not support chivalryonly crusading.

Urban II made decisions that were fundamental for the nascent religious movements, rebuilding papal authority and restoring its financial position. It was at the Council of Clermont that he arranged the juristic foundation of the crusading movement. The catalyst was an embassy from the Byzantine Emperor Alexios I Komnenos to the earlier Council of Piacenza, requesting military support in his conflict with the Seljuk Empire. These Turks were expanding into Anatolia and threatening Constantinople. He subsequently expressed the dual objectives for the campaign: firstly, freeing Christians from Islamic rule; secondly, freeing the Holy Sepulchrethe tomb of Christ in Jerusalemfrom Muslim control. This led to what is recognised as the first crusading expedition.
 
The First Crusade was a military success, but a papal failure. Urban initiated a Christian movement seen as pious and deserving but not fundamental to the concept of knighthood. Crusading did not become a duty or a moral obligationlike a pilgrimage to Mecca or jihad were to Islamand the creation of military religious orders is indicative of this failure. Canon law forbade priests from warfare, so the orders consisted of a class of lay brothers, but the orders were otherwise remarkably like other monastic orders. The difference was that these became orders of monks called to the sword and to blood-shedding. This was a doctrinal revolution within the Church regarding warfare. Its acknowledgement in 1129 at the Council of Troyes integrated the concept of holy war into the doctrines of the Latin Church. This illustrated the failure of the Church to assemble a force of knights from the laity and the ideological split between crusades and chivalry. The military vulnerability of the settlers in the East required further supportive expeditions through the 12th and 13th centuries. In each generation, these followed the pattern of a military setback in the East, a request for aid, and crusade declarations from the papacy.

12th century 

The first century of crusading coincided with the Renaissance of the 12th century, and crusading was represented through the rich vernacular literature that evolved in France and Germany during the period. There are French language versions, and in the literary language of southern FranceOccitan, of epic poems such as the  about the Siege of Antioch (1268) and the  about the Albigensian Crusade. Songs dedicated to the subject of crusadingknown as crusade songsare rare. Still, from the time of the Second Crusade onwards, many works survive in Occitan, French, German, Spanish, and Italian that include crusading as a topic or use it as an allegory. Poet-composers such as the Occitan troubadours Marcabru and Cercamon wrote songs with themes called  and about absent loves called . Crusading became the subject of songs and poems rather than creating new genres. Troubadours, and their northern French  and German  equivalents, grew in popularity from 1160, leaving many songs about the third and fourth crusades. Crusade songs served multiple purposes:
 They provided material for the poet/performer, variations on courtly love, allegories, and paradigms.
 Audiences learnt doctrine, information, and propaganda unmediated by the Church.
 They reinforced the nobility's self-image, confirmed its position in society, and inspired .
 They provided for the expression of injustice and criticism of mismanagement when events did not go well.
 
There is little evidence of protest by senior churchmen, although it is likely that had the First Crusade failed this would have been different. The crusade's success was astonishing and seen as only possible via a manifestation of God's will. When Paschal succeeded Urban he ended the schism by defeating the three anti-popes that followed Clement III. He also quarelled with Henry V, Holy Roman Emperor, his eventual successor Guy, archbishop of Vienne (later Calixtus II), and Church reformists over the right to invest bishops. His legislation developed that of his predecessors in connection with crusading. After the failed 1101 crusade, he supported Bohemond I of Antioch's gathering of another army with the provision of the flag of St. Peter and a cardinal legate, Bruno of Segni. Calixtus II extended the definition of crusading during his five years as Pope, before his death in 1124. He was one of the six sons of William I, Count of Burgundy and a distant relation to Baldwin II of Jerusalem. Three of his brothers died taking part in the Crusade of 1101. This fact exemplifies that early crusade recruitment concentrated in certain families and networks of vassals. These groups demonstrated their commitment through funding, although the sale of churches and tithes may have been a pragmatic acceptance that retaining these properties was unsustainable in the face of the reform movement in the Church. These kinship groups often exhibited traditions of pilgrimage to Jerusalem, association with Cluniac monastacism, the reformed papacy, and the veneration of certain saints. Female relatives spread these values through marriage. He also equated the reconquest of Iberia from the Muslims with crusading in the Holy Land, proposing a war on two fronts and posthumously leading to the campaign by King Alfonso I of Aragon against Granada in 1125.
 
Strategically, the crusaders could not hold Jerusalem in isolation, which led to the establishment of other western polities known as the Latin East. Even then, these required regular missions for their defence, supported by the developing military orders. The movement expanded into Spain with campaigns in 1114, 1118, and 1122. Eugenius III was influenced by Bernard of Clairvaux to join the Cistercians. Exiled by an antipapal commune, Eugenius III encouraged King Louis VII of France and the French to defend Edessa from the Muslims with the bull  in 1145, and again, slightly amended, in 1146. Eugenius III commissioned Bernard of Clairvaux to the crusade and travelled to France where he issued  (II) under the influence of Bernard, associating attacks on the Wends and the reconquest of Spain with crusading. The crusade in the East was not a success, and he subsequently resisted further crusading. Although there were three campaigns in Spain, and in 1177 one in the East, the next three decades saw the lowest ebb of the movement until the 15thcentury. This lull ended when news of the defeat at the hands of the Muslims at the Battle of Hattin created consternation throughout Europe and reignited enthusiasm. Early crusadessuch as the First, Second and Albigensianincluded peasants and non-combatants until the high costs of journeying by sea made participation in the Third and Fourth Crusade impossible for the general populace. Afterward, the professional and popular crusades diverged, such as in 1309 when the Crusade of the Poor and one by the Hospitallers occurred simultaneously, both responding to Pope ClementV's crusading summons of the previous year. 
 
The fashion derived from the biblical passage in Luke 9:23 "to carry one's cross and follow Christ". Through this action, a personal relationship between Crusaders and God was formed that marked the crusader's spirituality. Anyone could become a crusader, irrespective of gender, wealth, or social standing. The Holy Land was the patrimony of Christ; its recovery was on behalf of God. The Albigensian Crusade was a defence of the French Church, the Baltic Crusades were campaigns conquering lands beloved of Christ's mother Mary for Christianity.

13th century
Crusade providentialism was intricately linked with a prophetic sensibility at the end of the 12thcentury. Joachim of Fiore included the war against the infidels in his cryptic conflations of history combining past, present, and future. Such was his influence that Richard I of England met him in Messina en route to the East because, in his view, "for this Joachim had the spirit of prophecy and used to foretell what was going to happen". Franciscans such as Salimbene saw themselves as an "order of little ones" amongst a revivalist enthusiasm and a spirit of prophetic elation. The Austrian Rhymed Chronicle added prophetic elements of mytho-history to the Children's Crusade. In 1213, Innocent III called for the Fifth Crusade by announcing that the days of Islam were over: "The sway of the beast in Revelations will last 666 years of which already nearly six hundred have passed." The Church also condemned and suppressed heretics.
 
For recruitment purposes, popes initiated each crusade by publicly preaching its aims, spiritual value, and justification. Preaching could be both authorized and unofficial. The Church transmitted news through its hierarchy via papal bulls. This system was not always dependable, because of conflict among clerics, local political concerns, and lack of education. From the 12thcentury, the Cistercian Order provided propaganda for campaigns, and the Dominicans and Franciscans followed in the 13thcentury. Mendicant friars and papal legates targeted different geographies. This sophisticated propaganda system was a prerequisite for the success of multiple concurrent crusades. The message varied, but the aim of papal control of crusading remained. Preachers called for Holy Land crusades across Europe, but only preached smaller venturessuch as the Northern and Italian crusadeslocally to avoid tension in recruitment. Papal authority was critical for the effectiveness of the indulgence and the validity of vow redemption. Aristocratic culture, family networks, and feudal hierarchies spread informal propaganda, often by word of mouth. Courts and tournaments were arenas where the population shared stories, songs, poems, news, and information about crusades. Songs about the crusades became increasingly popular, although troubadours were hostile after the Albigensian Crusade. Chivalric virtues were heroism, leadership, martial prowess, and religious fervour. Visual representations in books, churches, and palaces served the same purpose. Themes were expanded in church art and architecture via murals, stained glass windows, and sculptures, such as the windows at the abbey of Saint-Denis, or the murals commissioned by Henry III of England, as well as by the many churches that were modelled after the Holy Sepulchre at Jerusalem.
 
From around 1225 to 1500, there are more than fifty texts in Middle English and Middle Scots with crusading themes. Performers read these to an audience, as opposed to the audience reading them, for entertainment and as propaganda for political and religious identity, differentiating the Christian "us" and the non-Christian "other". The works include romances, travelogues such as Mandeville's Travels, poems such as William Langland's Piers Plowman and John Gower's Confessio Amantis, the Hereford Map and the works of Geoffrey Chaucer. That writers wrote these after crusading fervour had diminished demonstrates an ongoing interest. The authors depicted chivalric Christendom as victorious and superior, as holding the spiritual and moral high ground. They are adaptated from translations of French originals. Some authors, such as Guy of Warwick, portrayed Muslim leaders as analogous to contemporary politicians. Popular motifs include chivalrous Christian knights seeking adventure and fighting Muslim giants, or a king travelling in disguise, such as Charlemagne in the Scots Taill of Rauf Coilyear. Crusading literature represented legendary figures with military and moral authority. Charlemagne was portrayed as a role model, famed for his victories over the pagan Saxons and Vikings, his religious fervour marked by forced conversions. The entertainment aspect played a vital role in encouraging an element of "Saracen bashing". The literature demonstrates populist religious hatred and bigotry, in part because Muslims and Christians were economic, political, military, and religious rivals while exhibiting a popular curiosity about and fascination with the "Saracens".
 
In 1198, Innocent III was elected pope, and he reshaped the ideology and practice of crusading. This was done by creating a new executive office to organize the Fourth Crusade, appointing executors in each province of the Church, as well as having freelancers, such as Fulk of Neuilly, preaching. This system developed further in time for the Fifth Crusade, with executive boards, that held legatine power, established in each province. Delegates in dioceses and archdioceses reported to these bodies on promotional policy while the papacy codified preaching. Political circumstances meant that more pragmatic and ad-hoc approaches followed, but the coherence of local promotion remained greater than before. Under Innocent III the papacy introduced taxation to fund the campaigns and encouraged donations. In 1199, he was the first pope to deploy the conceptual and legal apparatus developed for crusading to enforce papal rights. From the 1220s, crusader privileges were regularly granted to those who fought against heretics, schismatics, or those Christians the papacy considered non-conformist.
 
Part of the tradition of outbreaks of popular crusading that lasted from 1096 until the 1514 Hungarian Peasants' Crusade, the 1212 Children's Crusade was the first independent popular crusade; it sprung from the preaching for the Albigensian Crusade and parades seeking God's assistance for the Iberian crusades. All crusades not authorized by the Church were illicit and unaccompanied by papal representation. Crusades of this type were atypical, and their participants were unconventional crusaders. However, those who took part perceived themselves as authentic crusaders, using pilgrimage and crusade emblems, including the cross. Historians describe these events variously as people's crusades, peasants' crusades, shepherds' crusades, and crusades of the poor. Despite a broad range of research topics, it is difficult for historians to identify common features. There is evidence of charismatic leadership until the 14thcentury. Eschatology led to antisemitic Judaic violence and trends of self-determination amongst the involuntary poor. Popular crusades were diverse but shared historical circumstances with official crusades. These events demonstrate the power of crusading ideas, and that non-noble believers were engaged in the momentous events of Latin Christendom. The focus on the activity of clerics and warrior knights underestimates the movement's importance.

Between 1217 and 1221, Cardinal Hugo Ugolino of Segni led a preaching team in Tuscany and northern Italy as papal legate. At this time:
 He negotiated the end of various conflicts in Lucca, Pisa, Pistola, the Republic of Genoa, Bologna and the Republic of Venice.
 Used the five percent income tax on the church, a tax known as the "clerical twentieth".
 Paid mercenaries to join the Fifth Crusade, which was delayed by Frederick II's repeatedly postponed embarkation.

In this way, the development of more lax rules regarding church funding and crusade recruitment is evidenced. Ugolino became pope in 1227, taking the name Pope Gregory IX, and excommunicated Frederick for his prevarication. Frederick finally arrived in the Holy Land where he negotiated Christian access to Jerusalem, but his claim to the crown through marriage and his excommunicate status created political conflict in the kingdom. The settlement was decried by Gregory, but he used the resulting peace to further develop the wider movement:
 The poor orders organized inquisitions into heretics.
 The Church expanded crusade recruitment.
 Missionaries evangelized.
 Negotiations opened with the Greek Church.
 The Dominican Order channelled support to the Teutonic Order.

Gregory was the first pope to deploy the full range of crusading mechanismssuch as indulgences, privileges, and taxesagainst the emperor, and extended commutation of crusader vows from expeditions to Outremer theatres. These measures and the use of clerical income tax in the conflict with the emperor formed the foundations for political crusades by Gregory's successor, Innocent IV.
 
In 1241, after the conflict in Lombardy and Sardinia, Frederick II's army threatened Rome. Gregory IX responded with crusading terminology. Innocent IV based crusading ideology on the Christians' right to ownership. He acknowledged Muslims' land ownership but emphasised that this was subject to Christ's authority. Rainald of Segni, who became pope in December 1254, taking the name Alexander IV, continued the policies of Gregory IX and Innocent IV. This meant supporting crusades against the Staufen dynasty, the North African Moors, and pagans in Finland and the Baltic region. He attempted to give Sicily to Edmund Crouchback, the son of King Henry III, in return for a campaign to win it from Manfred, King of Sicily, the son of Frederick II. But this was logistically impossible, and the campaigns were unsuccessful. Alexander failed to form a league to confront the Mongols in the East or the invasion of Poland and Lithuania. Frequent calls to fight in eastern Europe (1253–1254, 1259) and for the Outremer (1260–1261) raised small forces, but Alexander's death prevented a general passage. At the Second Council of Lyons in 1274, Bruno von Schauenburg, Humbert, Guibert of Tournai, and William of Tripoli produced treatises articulating the requirements for success. Crusading appears to have maintained popular appeal, with recruits from a wide geographical area continuing to take the cross.

There is evidence of early criticism of crusading and the behaviour of crusaders. Although few challenged the concept itself in the 12thand13thcenturies, there were vociferous objections to crusades against heretics and Christian lay powers. The Fourth Crusade's attack on Constantinople and the use of resources against enemies of the Church in Europe, such as the Albigensian heretics and Hohenstaufen, were all denounced. Troubadours were critical of expeditions in southern France, noting with regret the neglect of the Holy Land. The behaviour of combatants was regarded as inconsistent with that expected in a holy war. Chroniclers and preachers complained of sexual promiscuity, avarice, and overconfidence. Western Europeans blamed failuresthe First Crusade, the defeat of the kingdom of Jerusalem at Hattin by Saladin, and other campaignson human sin. Gerhoh of Reichersberg equated the failures of the Second Crusade to the coming of the Antichrist.

Remediation included ceremonial marches, reformation requests, prohibitions of gambling and luxuries, and limits on the number of women involved. The Würzburg Annals condemned the behaviour of the crusaders and suggested it was the devil's work. LouisIX of France's defeat at the Battle of Mansurah provoked challenges to crusading in sermons and treatises, such as Humbert of Romans's (The preaching of the cross). The cost of armies led to taxation, an idea attacked as an unwelcome precedent by Roger Wendover, Matthew Paris, and Walther von der Vogelweide. Critics raised concerns about Franciscan and Dominican friars abusing the system of vow redemption for financial gain. The peaceful conversion of Muslims was an option, but there is no evidence that this represented public opinion, and the continuation of crusading indicates the opposite.

At the end of the 13thcentury, the impending Mamluks victory in the Holy Land left the crusading movement in crisis. Success in Spain, Prussia, and Italy did not compensate for losing the Holy Land. This was a crisis of faith, as well as of military strategy, that the Second Council of Lyon considered religiously shameful. The military ordersparticularly the Teutonic Orderwere disparaged for pride, avarice, devoting their wealth to lives of ease and luxury, and not maintaining large enough forces in the Holy Land. Armed conflict between the Templars and Hospitallers and between Christians in the Baltic hindered cooperation. The Church deemed military action in the East less effective because of the independence of the orders and their perceived reluctance to fight the Muslims, with whom their critics considered they were on overly friendly terms. Although a minority view held by Roger Bacon and others was that aggression, particularly in the Baltic, impeded conversion.

14th century
The crisis did not end with the final fall of the Outremer in 1291, as general opinion did not consider that final. It was only when the Hundred Years' War began in 1337 that hopes for recovery faded. However, ideas, and the consolidation of methods of organisation and finance following the Council and spanning the decades around 1300, demonstrated qualities of engagement, resilience, and adaptability that in part enabled the movement's survival for generations. One of Pope Gregory X's objectives was the reunification of the Latin and Greek churches, which he viewed as essential for a new crusade and the Outremer's protection. At the Second Council of Lyon, he demanded the Orthodox delegation accept all Latin teaching. In return, Gregory offered a reversal of papal support for Charles I of Anjou, the king of Sicily, to meet the Byzantines' primary motivation of the cessation of Western attacks. However, there was little interest from European monarchs, who were focussed on their own conflicts. Gregory created a complex tax gathering system for the funding of crusading, dividing Christendom in 1274 into twenty-six collectorates. Each of these was under the direction of a general collector who further delegated the assessment of tax liability to reduce fraud. The vast amounts raised by this system led to clerical criticism of obligatory taxation.

Even then there were more than twenty treatises on the recovery of the Holy Land between the councils of Lyon in 1274 and Vienna in 1314, prompted by Gregory X and his successors following the example of Innocent III in requesting advice. This advice led to plans for a blockade of the Mamluks, a  that provided a bridgehead followed by a  using a professional army. Writers debated details through the prism of Capetian and Aragonese dynastic politics. Short-lived popular crusading broke out in every decade, such as those prompted by the Mongol victory over the Mamluks at Homs and popular crusades in France and Germany. The papacy's institutionalisation of taxation, including a six-year tithe levied on clerical incomes, to pay for professional crusading armies on a contractual basis was an extraordinary achievement despite numerous challenges. The 1320  of the Second Shepherds' Crusade was the first time that the papacy decried a popular crusade.
 
Beginning in 1304 and lasting the entire 14thcentury, the Teutonic Order used the privileges Innocent IV had granted in 1245 to recruit crusaders in Prussia and Livonia, in the absence of any formal crusade authority. Commencing in 1332, the numerous Holy Leagues in the form of temporary alliances between interested Christian powers, were a new manifestation of the movement. Successful campaigns included the capture of Smyrna in 1344, the Battle of Lepanto in 1571, and the recovery of territory in the Balkans between 1684 and 1697.
 
After the Treaty of Brétigny between England and France, the anarchic political situation in Italy prompted the curia to begin issuing indulgences for those who would fight the Routiers threatening the pope and his court at Avignon. In 1378, the Western Schism split the papacy into two and then three, with rival Popes declaring crusades against each other. The growing threat from the Ottoman Turks provided a welcome distraction that would unite the papacy and divert the violence to another front. By the end of the century, the Teutonic Order's  had become obsolescent. Commoners had limited interaction with crusading beyond the preaching of indulgences, the success of which depended on the preacher's ability, local powers' attitudes, and the extent of promotion. However, there is no evidence that the failure to organize anti-Turkish crusading was due to popular apathy or hostility rather than to finance and politics.

15th century
The Venetian Gabriel Condulmaro succeeded Pope MartinV as Eugenius IV in 1431 and developed the policy of ecumenical negotiation with the Byzantines. Emperor John V Palaiologos visited him with a large delegation for talks which led to the proclamation the union of the Latin, Greek Orthodox, Armenian, Nestorian, and Cypriot Maronite churches. The reward for the Byzantines was military support. Between 1440 and 1444, Eugenius co-ordinated the defence of Constantinople from the Turks by crusading movements through the Balkan Christians (especially the Hungarian commander John Hunyadi), the Venetian navy, the papacy, and other western rulers. This policy failed with the Balkan powers' disastrous defeat at the Battle of Varna in November 1444. Opponents deposed Eugenius at the Council of Basel in 1439 in favour of Felix V, but the opponents lost support and Eugenius was able to continue his policies until his death in 1447. In 1453, Mehmed II took Constantinople, ushering in twenty-eight years of the sultanate's expansion.
 

Humanist Enea Silvio became Pope Pius II in 1458. Constantinople had fallen to the Ottomans in 1453, and its recovery was the primary focus of his pontificate. The Congress of Mantua was an unsuccessful blending of crusading with humanist thought to create a European alliance, even though Pius promised to personally participate in the expedition. His famous Latin letters and speeches at Mantua, at the Diets of Regensburg, and Frankfurt became models of their genre-blending humanist styles and thought with Pope Urban II's sermon at Clermont, the First Crusade, the chronicle of Robert of Rheims, and Bernard of Clairvaux's letter of exhortation. Besides this, he also advised the conqueror of Constantinople to convert to Christianity and become a second Constantine. Pope Pius II came close to organizing an anti-Turkish crusade in 1464 but failed. During his pontificate, and those of his immediate successors, funds and military supplies raised were inadequate, mistimed, or misdirected. This was despite:
 The commissioning of advisory tracts reconsidering the political, financial, and military issues.
 Exiled rulers who toured Christendom's courts seeking assistance.
 Individuals, such as the Cardinal Bessarion, dedicating themselves to the crusading movement.
 The continued levying of church taxes and preaching of indulgences.
 
Warfare was now more professional and costly. There was disillusionment and suspicion of how practical the objectives of the movements were. Lay sovereigns were more independent and prioritized their own objectives. The political authority of the papacy was reduced by the Great Schism, so popes such as Pius II and Innocent VIII found their congresses ignored. Politics and self-interest wrecked any plans. All of Europe acknowledged the need for a crusade to combat the Ottoman Empire, but effectively all blocked its formation. Popular feeling is difficult to judge: actual crusading had long since become distant from most commoners' lives. One example from 1488 saw Wageningen parishioners influenced by their priest's criticism of crusading to such a degree they refused to allow the collectors to take away donations. This contrasts with chronicle accounts of successful preaching in Erfurt at the same time and the extraordinary response for a crusade to relieve Belgrade in 1456.
 
Rodrigo Borja, who became Pope Alexander VI in 1492, attempted to reignite crusading to counter the threat of the Ottoman Empire, but his secular ambitions for his son Cesare and objective to prevent King Charles VIII of France from conquering Naples were paramount. The sale of indulgences gained large sums, but there was opposition to the clerical tithes and other fundraising efforts to support mercenary crusading armies. The grounds for this opposition were that the papacy used funds in Italy and that secular rulers misappropriated funds. Charles VIII's invasion plans prevented the organization of a crusade by Hungary, Bohemia, and Maximilian in 1493, leading instead to Italo-Turkish alliances. Marino Sanuto the Younger, Stephen Teglatius, and Alexander himself in Inter caetera wrote of the continued commitment to crusading, the organisational issues, theory, the impact of the Spanish Reconquista completed with the capture of Granada in 1492, the defence and expansion of the faith, and partitioning northern Africa and the Americas between Portugal and Spain, the conquest of which he granted crusading privileges and funding. Around the end of the 15thcentury, the military orders were transformed. Castile nationalized its orders between 1487 and 1499. In 1523, the Hospitallers retreated from Rhodes and the State of the Teutonic Order became the hereditary Duchy of Prussia when the last Prussian master, Albrecht of Brandenburg-Ansbach, converted to Lutheranism and became the first duke under oath to his uncle the Polish king.

16th century
In the 16thcentury, the rivalry between Catholic monarchs prevented anti-Protestant crusades, but individual military actions were rewarded with crusader privileges, including Irish Catholic rebellions against English Protestant rule and the Spanish Armada's attack on England under Queen Elizabeth I. In 1562, Cosimo I de' Medici, Grand Duke of Tuscany, became the hereditary Grand Master of the Order of Saint Stephen, a Tuscan military order he founded, which was modelled on the knights of Malta. The Hospitallers remained the only independent military order with a positive strategy. Other orders continued as aristocratic corporations while lay powers absorbed local orders, outposts, and priories. Political concerns provoked self-interested polemics that mixed the legendary and historical past. Humanist scholarship and theological hostility created an independent historiography. The rise of the Ottomans, the French Wars of Religion, and the Protestant Reformation encouraged the study of crusading. Some Roman Catholic writers considered the crusades gave precedents for dealing with heretics. It was thought that the crusaders were sincere, but there was increasing uneasiness with considering war as a religious exercise as opposed to having a territorial objective.

17th century and later
Crusading continued in the 17thcentury, mainly associated with the Hapsburgs and the Spanish national identity. Crusade indulgences and taxation were used in support of the Cretan War (1645–1669), the Battle of Vienna, and the Holy League (1684). Although the Hospitallers continued the military orders in the 18thcentury, the crusading movement soon ended in terms of acquiescence, popularity, and support.
 
The French Revolution resulted in widespread confiscations from the military orders, which were now largely irrelevant, apart from minor effects in the Hapsburg Empire. The Hospitallers continued acting as a military order from its territory in Malta until the island was conquered by Napoleon in 1798. In 1809, Napoleon went on to suppress the Order of St Stephen, and the Teutonic Order was stripped of its German possessions before relocating to Vienna. At this point, its identity as a military order ended.

Legacy
Some historians have maintained that the Kingdom of Jerusalem was the first experiment in western European colonialism, seeing the Outremer as a "Europe Overseas". Certainly by the mid-19thcentury, the crusader states that had existed in the East were both a nationalist rallying point and emblematic of European colonialism. This is a contentious issue, as others maintain that the accepted definitions of a colony do not fit the Latin settlements in the Levantthat is territory politically directed by or economically exploited for the benefit of a homeland, or subject to migration. Writers at the time did refer to colonists and migration, this means that academics find the concept of a religious colony useful, defined as territory captured and settled for religious reasons whose inhabitants maintain contact with their homelands due to a shared faith, and the need for financial and military assistance. That said, the crusading movement led directly to the occupation of the Byzantine Empire by western colonists after the Fourth Crusade. In Venetian Greece, the relationship with Venice and the political and economic direction the city provided matches the more conventional definition of colonialism. In fact, its prosperity and relative safety drained settlers from the Latin East, which weakened the religious colonies of the Levant.
 
The raising, transporting, and supply of large armies led to a flourishing trade between Europe and the Outremer. The Italian city-states of Genoa and Venice flourished, planting profitable trading colonies in the eastern Mediterranean. The crusades consolidated the papal leadership of the Latin Church, reinforcing the link between the Catholic Church, feudalism, and militarism, and increased the tolerance of the clergy for violence. Muslim libraries contained classical Greek and Roman texts that allowed Europe to rediscover pre-Christian philosophy, science, and medicine. Opposition to the growth of the system of indulgences became a catalyst for the Reformation in the early 16thcentury. The crusades also had a role in the formation and institutionalisation of the military and the Dominican orders as well as of the Medieval Inquisition.
 
The behaviour of the crusaders in the eastern Mediterranean area appalled the Greeks and Muslims, creating a lasting barrier between the Latin world and the Islamic and Orthodox regions. This became an obstacle to the reunification of the Christian Church and fostered a perception of Westerners as defeated aggressors. Many historians argue that the interaction between the western Christian and Islamic cultures played a ultimately positive part in the development of European civilization and the Renaissance. Relations between Europeans and the Islamic world stretched across the entire length of the Mediterranean Sea, leading to an improved perception of Islamic culture in the West. But this broad area of interaction also makes it difficult for historians to identify the specific sources of cultural cross-fertilisation.
 
Historical parallelism and the tradition of drawing inspiration from the Middle Ages have become keystones of political Islam, encouraging ideas of modern jihad and long struggle, while secular Arab nationalism highlights the role of Western imperialism. Muslim thinkers, politicians, and historians have drawn parallels between the crusades and modern political developments such as the League of Nations mandates to govern Syria, Lebanon, and Palestine, then the United Nations Partition Plan for Palestine. Right-wing circles in the Western world have drawn opposing parallels, considering Christianity to be under an Islamic religious and demographic threat that is analogous to the situation at the time of the crusades. Advocates present crusader symbols and anti-Islamic rhetoric as an appropriate response, even if only for propaganda. These symbols and rhetoric are used to provide a religious justification and inspiration for a struggle against a religious enemy. Some historians, such as Thomas F. Madden, argue that modern tensions result from a constructed view of the crusades created by colonial powers in the 19thcentury, which provoked Arab nationalism. For Madden, the crusades are a medieval phenomenon in which the crusaders were engaged in a defensive war on behalf of their co-religionists.
 
In 1936, the Spanish Catholic Church supported the coup of Francisco Franco, declaring a crusade against Marxism and atheism. Thirty-six years of National Catholicism followed, during which the idea of Reconquista as a foundation of historical memory, celebration, and Spanish national identity became entrenched in conservative circles. Reconquista lost its historiographical hegemony when Spain restored democracy in 1978, but it remains a fundamental definition of the medieval period within conservative sectors of academia, politics, and the media because of its strong ideological connotations.

Historiography

The description and interpretation of crusading began with accounts of the First Crusade. The image and morality of the first expeditions served as propaganda for new campaigns. The understanding of the crusades was based on a limited set of interrelated texts.  (Exploits of the Franks) created a papist, northern French, and Benedictine template for later works that contained a degree of martial advocacy that attributed both success and failure to God's will. This clerical view was challenged by vernacular adventure stories based on the work of Albert of Aachen. William of Tyre expanded Albert's writing in his Historia, which was completed by 1200. His work described the warrior state the Outremer became as a result of the tension between the providential and the worldly. Medieval crusade historiography predominately remained interested in moralistic lessons, extolling the crusades as moral and cultural norms. Academic crusade historian Paul Chevedden argued that these accounts are anachronistic, in that they were aware of the success of the First Crusade. He argues that, to understand the state of the crusading movement in the 11thcentury, it is better to examine the works of Urban II who died unaware of the outcome.

Independent historiography emerged in the 15thcentury and was informed by humanism and hostility to theology. This grew in popularity in the 16thcentury, encouraged by events such as the rise of the Ottoman Turks, the French Wars of Religion, and the Protestant Reformation. Traditional crusading provided exemplars of redemptive solutions that were, in turn, disparaged as papal idolatry and superstition. War against the infidel was laudable, but crusading movement doctrines were not. Popes persisted in issuing crusade bulls for generations, but international laws of war that discounted religion as a cause were developed. A nationalist view developed, providing a cultural bridge between the papist past and Protestant future based on two dominant themes for crusade historiography: firstly, intellectual, or religious disdain; and secondly, national, or cultural admiration. Crusading now had only a technical impact on contemporary wars but provided imagery of noble and lost causes. Opinions of crusading moved beyond the judgment of religion and increasingly depicted crusades as models of the distant past that were either edifying or repulsive.
 
18thcentury Age of Enlightenment philosopher historians narrowed the chronological and geographical scope to the Levant and the Outremer between 1095 and 1291. There were attempts to set the number crusades at eight while others counted five large expeditions that reached the eastern Mediterranean1096–1099, 1147–1149, 1189–1192, 1217–1229, and 1248–1254. In the absence of an Ottoman threat, influential writers considered crusading in terms of anticlericalism, viewing crusading with disdain for its apparent ignorance, fanaticism, and violence. By the 19thcentury, crusade enthusiasts disagreed with this view as being unnecessarily hostile and ignorant.
 
Increasingly positive views of the Middle Ages developed in the 19thcentury. A fascination with chivalry developed to support the moral, religious, and cultural mores of established society. In a world of unsettling change and rapid industrialization, nostalgic escapist apologists and popular historians developed a positive view of crusading. Jonathan Riley-Smith considers that much of the popular understanding of the crusades derives from the 19thcentury novels of Sir Walter Scott and the French histories of Joseph François Michaud. Michaud married admiration of supremacist triumphalismsupporting the nascent European commercial and political colonialism of the Middle Eastto the point where the Outremer were "Christian colonies". The Franco-Syrian society in the Outremer became seen as benevolent, an attractive idea justifying the French mandates in Syria and Lebanon. In 1953, Jean Richard described the kingdom of Jerusalem as "the first attempt by the Franks of the West to found colonies". In the absence of widespread warfare, 19thcentury Europe created a cult of war based on the crusades, linked to political polemic and national identities. After World War I, crusading no longer received the same positive responses; war was now sometimes necessary but not good, sanctified, or redemptive. Michaud's viewpoint provoked Muslim attitudes. The crusades had aroused little interest among Islamic and Arabic scholars until the collapse of the Ottoman Empire and the penetration of European power.
 
Jonathan Riley-Smith straddles the two schools regarding the motives and actions of early crusaders. The definition of a crusade remains contentious. Historians accept Riley-Smith's view that "everyone accepted that the crusades to the East were the most prestigious and provided the scale against which the others were measured". There is disagreement whether only those campaigns launched to recover or protect Jerusalem were proper crusades or whether those wars to which popes applied temporal and spiritual authority were equally legitimate. Today, crusade historians study the Baltic, the Mediterranean, the Middle East, and even the Atlantic, and crusading's position in, and derivation from, host and victim societies. Chronological horizons have crusades existing into the early modern world, e.g. the survival of the Order of St. John on Malta until 1798. The academic study of crusading in the West has integrated mainstream theology, the Church, law, popular religion, aristocratic society and values, and politics. The Muslim context now receives attention from Islamicists. Academics have replaced disdain with attempts to situate crusading within its social, cultural, intellectual, economic, and political context. Historians employ a wide range of evidence, including charters, archaeology, and the visual arts, to supplement chronicles and letters. Local studies have lent precision as well as diversity.

See also
 History of the Jews and the Crusades
 List of principal crusaders
 List of Crusader castles
 Women in the Crusades
 Criticism of crusading

References

Bibliography

Further reading